Močenok is a village and municipality in Šaľa District, in the Nitra Region of south-west Slovakia.

Names and etymology
The name is derived from Slavic mučeník – a martyr and is probably related to the cult of Saint Clement of Rome (a patron of the local church) whose relics were brought through Great Moravia to the Rome by Saint Cyril. The village was renamed to Mučníky in 1948, to Sládečkovce in 1951 (after a victim of a farmer strike from 1922) and returned to the original name in 1992.

History
In historical records the village was first mentioned in 1113.

Geography
The village lies at an altitude of 141 metres and covers an area of 46.39 km².
It has a population of about 4289 people.(31.12.2015)

Ethnicity
The village is about 97% Slovak and the other 3% is, mainly, Romani.

Facilities
The village has a pharmacy, a public library a gym and a football pitch. It also has a cinema.

References

External links
 
 

Villages and municipalities in Šaľa District